The 2009 Manchester Trophy was a professional tennis tournament played on outdoor red clay courts. It was the fifteenth edition of the tournament which was part of the 2009 ATP Challenger Tour. It took place in Manchester, England, United Kingdom between 11 and 19 July 2009.

Singles entrants

Seeds

 Rankings are as of July 6, 2009.

Other entrants
The following players received wildcards into the singles main draw:
  Daniel Cox
  Colin Fleming
  Ashley Hewitt
  Daniel Smethurst

The following players received entry from the qualifying draw:
  Andrew Anderson
  Olivier Charroin
  Jonathan Marray
  Igor Sijsling

Champions

Singles

 Olivier Rochus def.  Igor Sijsling, 6–3, 4–6, 6–2

Doubles

 Joshua Goodall /  Jonathan Marray def.  Colin Fleming /  Ken Skupski, 6–7(1), 6–3, [11–9]

References
Official website
ITF Search 
2009 Draws

Manchester Trophy
Manchester Open
2009 in English tennis